Agelena jirisanensis is a species of spider in the family Agelenidae, which contains at least 1,350 species . It was first described by Paik in 1965 and is native to Korea.

References

jirisanensis
Spiders of Asia
Spiders described in 1965